Ana Ofelia Murguía (born 8 December 1933) is a Mexican actress. She was born in Mexico City. Her early well known roles were in The Queen of the Night (1994) as Doña Victoria and as Doña Amelia in Nobody Will Speak of Us When We're Dead (1995).

In recent years, she is best known for voicing Mama Coco in the 2017 Disney-Pixar animated movie Coco.

Murguía holds the record for the most nominations for the Ariel Award for Best Actress without a win, having been nominated a total of five times. She also jointly holds the record, with Isela Vega, for the most Ariel Award for Best Supporting Actress wins, with three; with a further three nominations.

Selected filmography
 Coco (2017) as Coco
 La maceta (2002) .... (cortometraje)
 Otilia Rauda (2001) .... sirvienta
 Pachito Rex, me voy pero no del todo (2001) .... Rosa María
 Escrito en el cuerpo de la noche (2000) .... Dolores
 Sexo por compasión (2000) .... vendedora de colmado (coproducción con España)
 Su alteza serenísima (2000) ....
 Ave María (1999) .... Úrsula (coproducción con España)
 Cruz (1998) .... (cortometraje)
 De noche vienes, Esmeralda (1997) .... doña Beatriz
 El anzuelo (1996) .... doña Rosa
 De muerte natural (1996) .... Jovita
 Nobody Will Speak of Us When We're Dead (Nadie hablará de nosotras cuando hayamos muerto) (1995) as doña Amelia 
 La tarde de un matrimonio de clase media (1995) .... esposa (cortometraje)
 Ámbar (1994) ....
 The Queen of the Night, La reina de la noche (1994), as doña Victoria, madre de Lucha
 El jardín del edén (1994) .... Juana
 Luces de la noche (1994) ....
 Morena (1994) .... vecina
 Objetos perdidos (1992) .... vecina (cortometraje)
 Mi querido Tom Mix (1991) .... Joaquina
 One Man's War [TV] (1957) .... doña Teresa (producción estadounidense)
 Diplomatic Immunity (Immunidad diplomática) (1991) .... Mayán (producción canadiense)
 Goitia, un dios para sí mismo (1988) ....
 Gaby, A True Story (Gaby, una historia verdadera) (1987) .... enfermera
 Los confines (1987) .... madre de Natalia
 Mexican, You Can Do It
 Chido guan (Tacos de oro) (1985) .... doña Meche
 Los Motivos de Luz (1985) mother-in-law of Luz
 Dune (Dunas) (1984) .... sirvienta del palacio (sin crédito)
 La pasión de Isabela (1984), as Cristina
 El corazón de la noche (1983) ....
 La Víspera (1982) as Irma
 María de mi corazón (1979) ....
 Amor libre (1978) ....
 Cadena perpetua (1978) .... esposa del señor Romero
 Naufragio (1977) .... Amparito
 La viuda negra (1977) ....
 Pedro Páramo (El hombre de la Media Luna) (1976) .... Damiana Cisneros
 José (1976) .... (cortometraje)
 Las Poquianchis (1976) .... Eva
 The Heist El apando (1975) .... celadora
 Esa es mi Irene (1975) ....
 El profeta Mimí (1972) ....
 Para servir a usted (1970) ....
 Pax? (1968) ....

References

External links

1933 births
Living people
Actresses from Mexico City
Mexican film actresses
Mexican television actresses